Evonne Cawley and Helen Gourlay were the defending champions. Cawley did not compete. Gourlay, first seeded, won the title together with fellow Australian Dianne Fromholtz – in the final they defeated second seeded Betsy Nagelsen and Kerry Reid.

Seeds

Draw

External links
 1977 Australian Open (January) – Women's draws and results at the International Tennis Federation

Women's Doubles
Australian Open (tennis) by year – Women's doubles